Late Show is the debut studio album by Canadian rock band The Beaches. Produced by Metric members Emily Haines and Jimmy Shaw, it was released by Island Records on October 13, 2017. The album was supported by the singles "Money" and "T-Shirt", the latter achieving number one on the Billboard Canada Rock chart. The album helped to earn the band the 2018 Juno Award for Breakthrough Group of the Year, alongside a nomination for the 2018 SOCAN Songwriting Prize for "Money".

Track listing

References

Further reading

2017 debut albums
Universal Music Canada albums
Albums recorded at Noble Street Studios